Tadao Matsui (born 1 March 1927) is a Japanese former sports shooter. He competed in the 50 metre pistol event at the 1960 Summer Olympics.

References

External links
  

1927 births
Possibly living people
Japanese male sport shooters
Olympic shooters of Japan
Shooters at the 1960 Summer Olympics
Sportspeople from Kanagawa Prefecture